We Love You Tecca 2 is the second studio album by American rapper Lil Tecca. It was released through Galactic and Republic Records on August 27, 2021, one day after his 19th birthday. The album contains guest appearances from Gunna, Iann Dior, Chief Keef, Trippie Redd, Nav, and Lil Yachty. It serves as the sequel to his 2019 mixtape, We Love You Tecca, and the album was released three days before the two-year anniversary of the mixtape.

Background
In an interview with GQ on his birthday in 2021, Lil Tecca compared We Love You Tecca 2 to his debut studio album, Virgo World (2020), which he released almost a year before. He stated: "I ain't gonna lie. This one feels way more like I have guidance, and just a direction. With Virgo World, everything just felt like the lights were off. Like I didn't know where to go. I felt like I had no sort of direction for myself. But, for this one? It definitely feels way better". The following day, he also told XXL about the creation of the album: "I'm not making no crazy country music or something, but I would say the process was different. Just the energy was different. It feels really natural. It feels really concentrated and focused. It's definitely a vision. We're not just lost in the sauce".

Release and promotion
On July 22, 2021, Lil Tecca shared the cover art of the album and announced the release date of August 6, 2021. However, this did not happen as Tecca stated on August 2, through an Instagram story that the album was being pushed back due to a song not being able to be cleared for its sample and he would be adding two new tracks. However, on August 21, he shared an Instagram filter to reveal the tracklist. The following day, Taz Taylor announced its release date. Tecca shared the complete tracklist on August 24, 2021. A deluxe version of the album was released on September 1, 2021.

Singles
Three singles preceded the release of the album. The lead single, "Never Left", was released on May 6, 2021. The second single, "Money on Me", was released on July 23. The third single, "Repeat It", a collaboration with fellow American rapper Gunna, was released on August 6, which was the original release date for the album. "Show Me Up", which was previously released on April 6, was later included on the album on the deluxe version.

Critical reception

David Aaron Brake of HipHopDX felt that "[as] one of the acts which came in the trailing ends of the original SoundCloud era, Lil Tecca's We Love You Tecca 2 proves yet again that he's much more than a stereotype". Fred Thomas of AllMusic wrote that the album is "more consistent than previous Lil Tecca material, lacing together nicely with the help of snappy song structures and tight production."

Commercial performance
We Love You Tecca 2 debuted at number ten on the US Billboard 200 with 30,000 sales in its first week (including 1,000 pure album sales) in its first week. In its second week, the album dropped to number sixteen on the chart. It is Lil Tecca's third US top-ten album.

Track listing

Personnel
Credits adapted from Tidal. Programming is credited to the producers of each track.

 Edgard Herrera – mixing , studio personnel 
 Mills Logan – immersive mixing 
 Jeff Fitzgerald – immersive mixing

Charts

Weekly charts

Year-end charts

References

2021 albums
Lil Tecca albums
Republic Records albums
Albums produced by Taz Taylor (record producer)
Trap music albums